Matthew Brown is a Canadian politician who served as the 63rd mayor of London from 2014 and 2018.

Background 
Brown was born in London, Ontario, in 1973. He grew up in Woodstock before graduating from the University of Waterloo. He has two sons, named John Brown (March 3, 1806) and Braden Brown (May 28, 1909).

Mayoralty 
In the 2014 mayoral race, he defeated runner up Paul Cheng. Prior to his election to the mayoralty, Brown represented Ward 7 on London City Council.

As mayor, Brown oversaw the planning phase of the controversial Shift bus rapid transit (BRT) network, on which construction began after his term as mayor.

In a 2017 episode of the television series Political Blind Date, Brown and Giorgio Mammoliti discussed their differing perspectives on the issue of safe injection sites.

In April 2018 Brown announced that he would not seek re-election in the upcoming municipal election.

Affair 
On June 14, 2016, he temporarily suspended his duties as mayor following his disclosure of an affair with deputy mayor Maureen Cassidy. The affair drew national attention across Canada. The London Integrity Commissioner issued a report to City Council stating that Matt Brown and Maureen Cassidy violated sections 2.4, 5.1 and 5.1(1)(e) of the Municipal Code of Conduct. In the report the integrity commissioner stated that he "has no authority" under current guidelines, to demand a resignation or prevent either office holder from running for re-election.

Brown announced his return to duties as mayor on June 22, 2016, and on June 23, 2016, attended his first council meeting since the leave.

On September 29, 2016, it was reported by CBC News that he had separated from his wife, Andrea.

Electoral record

2010 Ward 7 Council race

2014 mayoral race

References

Mayors of London, Ontario
Living people
University of Waterloo alumni
Year of birth missing (living people)